The Hazel Brook, also known as the Hen, is a tributary of the River Trym in Bristol, England.  It rises at Cribbs Causeway in South Gloucestershire.  From there, its course takes it south, passing the western end of Filton Aerodrome on its left bank, through Brentry and Henbury before dropping through a steep limestone gorge in the Blaise Castle estate.  It continues south through two lakes before joining the Trym at Coombe Dingle.

Hydrology 

Surface run-off in the upper catchment of the Hazel Brook, especially from the large retail centre at Cribbs Causeway, sends a good deal of silt into the system, slowing the flow and creating a risk of flooding downstream in the Trym. This problem has now been partially alleviated by the construction of the Catbrain attenuation reservoir near Cribbs Causeway. Measurements of pollution by the city council show the water to be relatively clean.

References

South Gloucestershire District
Rivers of Gloucestershire
Rivers of Bristol
2Hazel
Henbury